The following televisions programs include central LGBTQ+ themes or cast members.


News and information programs

See also

 Lists of television programs with LGBT characters

References

News